Global Conflicts: Latin America is a serious game. It was developed by Serious Games Interactive for Mac OS X and Microsoft Windows.

Summary
Global Conflicts: Latin America lets players explore key problems in Latin American countries.

In GC:LA, the player assumes the role of an investigative journalist on assignment in Bolivia, Guatemala, and Mexico where human rights violations, debt slavery, corruption, trafficking of humans, and pollution threaten the existence of the people. The player experiences situations taken from real life and develops an understanding of the conditions under which millions live. The goal of the game is to gather information to be used in confrontational interviews with people central to the conflict.

When they are done, the player is given a rating to show how well he has done in gathering information and using this to push people to get confessions for the article.

See also 
 Global Conflict: Palestine

Humanitarian video games
Europe-exclusive video games
MacOS games
Video games developed in Denmark
Windows games